Ceratotheca is a genus of plants in the family Pedaliaceae (sesame family) comprising about five species native to worldwide tropical areas and to southern Africa.

The genera name is derived from the Greek words keras meaning horn and theke meaning capsule.

Species
Species include:
Ceratotheca integribracteata Engl.
Ceratotheca reniformis Abels (Limpopo foxglove)
Ceratotheca saxicola E.A.Bruce
Ceratotheca sesamoides Endl. (false sesame)
Ceratotheca triloba (Bernh.) Hook.f. (South African foxglove)

References

External links

Pedaliaceae
Flora of Africa
Lamiales genera